Cunning is a surname. Notable people with this surname include:

Bobby Cunning (1930–1983), Scottish football player
Cam Cunning (born 1985), Canadian ice hockey player
Conal Cunning (born 1998), Irish hurler
Kat Cunning (born 1992), American actress and musician
Len Cunning (1950–2020), Canadian ice hockey player
Mike Cunning (born 1958), American professional golfer

See also